The ninth season of Calle 7 began on April 2, 2012, new contestants were introduced and some former participants returned. The teams, yellow and red, were divided into new and old contestants, respectively. Juan Carlos Palma and Federico Koch, known contestants who had previously left the competition, joined the yellow team (the new participants' team). Fernanda Gallardo, who competed in seasons five and six, joined the red team (the known contestants' team). Like the first two seasons, the system of the competition is individual. After a decline in the show's ratings, the show returned to achieve a stable audience this season.

Contestants

Teams Competition

Elimination order

2012 Chilean television seasons